Equaflight (also known as Equaflight Services) is an airline based in Pointe-Noire, Republic of the Congo, operating scheduled and chartered flights (passenger as well as cargo) out of its base at Pointe Noire Airport. The company was founded in 1998. Along with all airlines registered in the Republic of the Congo, Equaflight is banned from entering the European Union since 2009.

Destinations
Equaflight operates scheduled passenger flights to the following destinations:
Republic of the Congo
Brazzaville – Maya-Maya Airport
Pointe-Noire – Pointe Noire Airport base
Gabon
Port-Gentil – Port-Gentil International Airport
Additionally, the airline operates on-demand business charter flights under the Equajet brand.
Angola
Luanda – Quatro de Fevereiro Airport

Fleet
, the Equaflight fleet consisted of the following aircraft:

Former fleet 
 1 ATR 42-300
 1 ATR 42-320
 1 Embraer EMB 120 Brasilia
 1 Dornier 228-212

Certification
The IATA Operational Safety Audit (IOSA) program is the most recognized evaluation system, designed to assess the operational management and control systems of an airline.
Equaflight is IOSA registered since July 15, 2011, and become the first airline in Central Africa to obtain this label.

References

External links

Airlines of the Republic of the Congo
Airlines established in 1998
1998 establishments in the Republic of the Congo